Coleophora thurneri is a moth of the family Coleophoridae. It is found in southern France, Italy and Croatia.

The larvae feed on Artemisia alba. They create a brownish, very thin, tubular silken case of 10–11 mm with a mouth angle of about 45°. Larvae can be found in mid-May.

References

thurneri
Moths of Europe
Moths described in 1969